The Car & Bike Show is an automobile programme in India. It was followed by similar programmes including 'A Very Ferrari Summer', 'Love Life & Lamborghini', 'Autobahn', 'Another Ferrari Summer', 'Freewheeling', 'Freewheeling: A Big Dream', and an auto quiz show called 'Mahindra AQ'.

History
It is hosted by anchor Siddharth Vinayak Patankar, editor for the NDTV television station, and has been shown since 2003. In 2018 it reached its 750th episode.

Awards
 2008 NT Award for Best Automobile Show

See also
 India

References

External links
 Official website
 http://www.tubaah.com/shows.php?by_cat=190&userid=
 http://www.facebook.com/cnbshow
 
 https://www.youtube.com/watch?v=DZuiacpRVhE

Indian automotive television series